Sandtown is an unincorporated community in Tuscaloosa County, Alabama, United States.

References

Unincorporated communities in Tuscaloosa County, Alabama
Unincorporated communities in Alabama